Prva Crnogorska futsal Liga is the highest-ranked futsal league in Montenegro. It is governed by the Football Association of Montenegro and it is played under UEFA and FIFA rules. It was founded in 2006 and as of 2019–20 season, the league consists of 10 teams.

History
First official futsal competition in Montenegro was organized in January 1988, as a Republic qualifiers for the final SFR Yugoslavia tournament. Most successful teams at that time were Ratar and Transport from Podgorica, who represented Montenegro in the finals.
Era of significant successes started at nineties, as teams from Montenegro made big progress in futsal championship of FR Yugoslavia. On season 1993–94, Premijer (Nikšić) won the national title, and that was the very first championship won by one squad from Montenegro. Next year, Premijer was a runner-up of Yugoslav championship. On season 1995–96, another team from Nikšić became Yugoslav champion - Elektroprivreda and next year they finished second. Next big achievement of Montenegrin futsal teams came on season 2000–01. In the national finals played two teams from Montenegro, and the title won CD Shop Mocart (Danilovgrad), who won two games against Nikšić (7-2; 8-4). With that result, CD Shop Mocart became first Montenegrin side who participated in UEFA Futsal Champions League. Next time, CD Shop Mocart became a champion of Serbia and Montenegro on season 2002–03, after two victories in the final against Balestra Nikšić (2:1; 7:3). On season 2004-05, Municipium (Pljevlja) participated in Yugoslav championship finals, but they were defeated against Marbo Belgrade (2-1; 3-10)'.
In 2006, after the Independence referendum, Montenegro split from Serbia. Following that, Montenegrin Futsal League is founded as top-tier national competition. During the first two seasons, in competition dominated Municipium, while the title on season 2008–09 surprisingly won Montenegrostars (Budva). Next year, the title winner was CD Shop Mocart and on season 2010–11 Bajo Pivljanin (Plužine). Next two years, the title-holder was Jedinstvo (Bijelo Polje), whose domination was finished on season 2013–14, finished with the first title for Agama (Podgorica). Next year, another Podgorica side won the title - Titograd. Title for season 2015–16 won Military Futsal Team (Danilovgrad), and Titograd won their second title on season 2016–17. Next season, first title in history won Čelik (Nikšić). Record of the time made Titograd who won their third national title on season 2018–19.

Champions
Champions by season
Since its inception in 2006–07 season, nine different clubs have won the title of Montenegrin Futsal League champion. Titograd is the only team who won three titles. Including the trophies from Yugoslav era, another team which won three titles is CD Shop Mocart.
Two other teams, Municipium and Jedinstvo, won two titles - both twice in a row.

Sources:
https://fscg.me/files/documents/1124/Almanah%20fscg%202007-08_web.pdf https://fscg.me/files/documents/1126/Almanah%20fscg%202009%20-%2010_web.pdf https://fscg.me/files/documents/1128/Almanah%20fscg%202011%20-%2012_web.pdf https://fscg.me/files/documents/1130/Almanah%20fscg%202013-14_web.pdf https://fscg.me/files/documents/1132/Amlanah%20fscg%202015-16_web.pdf https://fscg.me/files/documents/1485/Godisnjak_2017-18_FINAL_web.pdf 

 Titles by Club 
 Montenegrin Futsal First League 
Below is a list of clubs with titles won in Montenegrin Futsal League.

 Overall 
Below is an overall list, with titles won in both leagues - Montenegrin Futsal League and FR Yugoslavia / Serbia and Montenegro Championship.

Top scorers

Participants and records

All-time participants (2006-)
Since foundation, in Montenegrin Futsal First League participated 25 different clubs. Below is a list of participants with number of seasons in the First League.

Records
Biggest league victory/defeat: 14–0, Cattaro vs. BOSS, (season 2013-14)
Longest unbeaten run: 27 matches, Municipium, 14.10.2006 - 10.11.2007Longest winning streak: 19 matches, Municipium, 25.11.2006 - 10.11.2007Longest run without win: 28 matches, BOSS, 07.10.2012 - 18.05.2014Longest losing streak: 23 matches, BOSS, 17.11.2012 - 18.05.2014Highest number of scored goals by season: 134, Military Futsal Team, season 2015-16
Highest number of conceded goals by season: 141'', Cattaro, season 2015-16

Current season
On season 2019-20, ten squads are playing in Montenegrin Futsal First League. After the 18 weeks of regular season, four best placed teams will qualify for the playoffs.
Below is the list of members of Montenegrin Futsal First League 2019-20.

See also
 Montenegro national futsal team
 Montenegrin First League
 Football Association of Montenegro
 Football in Montenegro

References

External links
Official Website

Football leagues in Montenegro
Montenegro